Edward Patrick "Mickey" Walker (July 13, 1903 (some sources indicate 1901) – April 28, 1981) was an American professional boxer who held both the world welterweight and world middleweight championships at different points in his career. Born in Elizabeth, New Jersey, he was also an avid golfer and would later be recognized as a renowned artist. Walker is widely considered one of the greatest fighters ever, with ESPN ranking him 17th on their list of the 50 Greatest Boxers of All-Time and boxing historian Bert Sugar placing him 11th in his Top 100 Fighters catalogue. Statistical website BoxRec rates Walker as the 6th best middleweight ever, while The Ring Magazine founder Nat Fleischer placed him at No. 4. The International Boxing Research Organization ranked Walker as the No. 4 middleweight and the No. 16 pound-for-pound fighter of all-time. Walker was inducted into the Ring magazine Hall of Fame in 1957 and the International Boxing Hall of Fame as a first-class member in 1990.

Professional career

Career beginnings 
Walker boxed professionally for the first time on February 10, 1919, fighting Dominic Orsini to a four-round no-decision in his hometown of Elizabeth, New Jersey. Walker did not venture from Elizabeth until his eighteenth bout, when he went to fight at Newark. On April 29, 1919, he was defeated by knockout in round one by Phil Delmontt, suffering his first defeat.

In 1920, he boxed twelve times, winning two and participating in ten no-decisions. Once again, all his bouts were held in New Jersey, which was, at the time, one of the areas where scoring systems had not been instituted in boxing. Each fight that lasted the scheduled distance was automatically declared a no-decision, regardless of who the better boxer had been.

World welterweight champion 
Walker boxed sixteen times in 1921, winning six, losing one and having nine no-decisions. By then, Rhode Island had become one of the areas where decisions from points scoring had been legislated and this attracted Walker. He lost on a disqualification to Joe Stenafik his first time there, but earned his first decision win in twelve rounds against Kid Green the second time around. He also met world champion boxer Jack Britton in a no-decision in New Jersey and beat Nate Siegal in Boston.

In 1922, Walker went 3–4–4 before getting a world title shot. He lost to Jock Malone that year. However, on November 1, 1922, he fought for the world welterweight title against Britton, the reigning champion. Walker outpointed Britton over fifteen rounds to take the title.

Walker vs. Greb 
Walker had thirteen fights in 1923, winning 11, having one no-decision and one no contest. He defended the title twice, against Pete Latzo and Jimmy Jones. Nine bouts followed in 1924, Walker winning six and having three no decisions. He defeated Lew Tendler and Bobby Barrett in defense of his world title and had two of his three no-decisions that year against Jock Malone.

After winning two fights to start 1925, he went up in division to challenge world middleweight champion Harry Greb on July 2 but failed to win the middleweight crown at that time, losing a fifteen-round decision to the  division champion. He went back to the welterweight division, defending his title against Dave Shade and retaining it by decision. He won three bouts, lost one and had three no-decisions that year.

World middleweight champion 

On May 20, 1926, Walker lost the world welterweight title in a rematch with Pete Latzo. It seemed Walker, now in his 20s, had physically matured out the welterweight division, though many might also point to his extra-curricular activities. Whatever the reasons, Walker then began concentrating on winning the world middleweight championship. On November 22, he finally was able to beat Jock Malone. On December 3, he reclaimed the world middleweight title with a controversial ten-round decision over world champion Tiger Flowers. He kept that title for five years, defending it three times. He beat Mike McTigue and former world champion Paul Berlenbach.

On March 28, 1929, he tried to become a member of the exclusive group of boxers who have been world champions in three different weight divisions, but lost a close ten-round decision to world light heavyweight champion Tommy Loughran. On June 19, 1931, Walker decided to vacate his world middleweight title and move up to the heavyweight division.

Later career 
Walker's debut as a heavyweight on July 22 against former world heavyweight champion Jack Sharkey ended with a fifteen-round draw (tie). In 1932, he went 5–1, beating such fighters as King Levinsky and Paulino Uzcudun before facing former world heavyweight champion Max Schmeling, who knocked Walker out in round eight.

He went down in weight again, to the light heavyweight division in 1933, when he lost a fifteen-round decision to Maxie Rosenbloom for the world title. The next year, Walker fought Rosenbloom again and was awarded a decision win. Unfortunately for Walker, Rosenbloom remained the champion, having taken Walker on in a non-title fight. Undaunted, Walker kept campaigning in that division until 1935, when he retired after losing to Eric Seelig by a seven-round technical knockout.

Retirement and death
After retiring from boxing, Walker opened a New York City restaurant that became a popular landmark. He became an accomplished painter, with many of his works exhibited at New York and London art galleries. During his boxing career, he found golf to be a suitable distraction to his training regimen and he often dragged his manager, Doc Kearns, and his kids to golf courses to play golf.

Walker said on the January 13, 1955 "You Bet Your Life" show that he was married and had two daughters. He also said he "fought a draw for the heavyweight title."

Walker was found by police in 1974 lying on a street in Freehold, NJ and taken to a hospital, where he was admitted with doctors initially thinking he was just a drunk lying on the street. Tests revealed Walker was suffering from Parkinson's Syndrome, arteriosclerosis and anemia. He was admitted to Marlboro Psychiatric Hospital for treatment. He died on April 28, 1981 in Freehold.

Professional boxing record
All information in this section is derived from BoxRec, unless otherwise stated.

Official record

All newspaper decisions are officially regarded as “no decision” bouts and are not counted in the win/loss/draw column.

Unofficial record

Record with the inclusion of newspaper decisions in the win/loss/draw column.

See also
List of welterweight boxing champions
List of middleweight boxing champions

References

External links 
 

Walker at Cyber Boxing Zone
Mickey Walker at The Boxing Magazine
 https://boxrec.com/media/index.php/The_Ring_Magazine%27s_Annual_Ratings:_Middleweight--1920s
 https://boxrec.com/media/index.php/The_Ring_Magazine%27s_Annual_Ratings:_Middleweight--1930s
 https://boxrec.com/media/index.php/The_Ring_Magazine%27s_Annual_Ratings:_Welterweight--1920s
 https://boxrec.com/media/index.php/The_Ring_Magazine%27s_Annual_Ratings:_Light_Heavyweight--1920s
 https://titlehistories.com/boxing/wba/wba-world-lh.html
 https://titlehistories.com/boxing/wba/wba-world-m.html
 https://titlehistories.com/boxing/wba/wba-world-wl.html
 https://titlehistories.com/boxing/na/usa/ny/nysac-lh.html
 https://titlehistories.com/boxing/na/usa/ny/nysac-m.html
 https://titlehistories.com/boxing/na/usa/ny/nysac-wl.html

1900s births
1981 deaths
Neurological disease deaths in New Jersey
American male boxers
Boxers from New Jersey
Deaths from Parkinson's disease
International Boxing Hall of Fame inductees
Middleweight boxers
Sportspeople from Elizabeth, New Jersey
Welterweight boxers